Greg Burke is an English rugby league footballer who plays as a  or  for the Barrow Raiders in the Betfred Championship.

He played for the Wigan Warriors in the Super League, and on loan from Wigan at the Bradford Bulls and Hull Kingston Rovers in the Super League and Workington Town in the Championship. Burke played for the Widnes Vikings in the top flight, and on loan from Widnes at Salford, before joining the Red Devils permanently in 2019.

Background
Burke was born in Wigan, Greater Manchester, England.

Wigan Warriors
He featured in 17 games in 2013 scoring one try against Catalans Dragons. He missed out on the play-off games and the Grand Final. During 2014 he was not selected for the 2014 World Club Challenge but he did play 6 league games. Burke returned to Wigan for the 2016 season and featured in 19 games for the Warriors, before departing to join Widnes in the summer.

Loan to Bradford Bulls
Burke signed on a one-month loan deal at the Bradford Bulls in 2014. He featured in Round 4 (Hull F.C.) in which he sustained a dislocated shoulder.

Loan to Hull KR
In November 2014, Burke signed for Hull Kingston Rovers on loan for the 2015 season, making 21 appearances throughout the season.

Salford
He played in the 2019 Super League Grand Final defeat by St Helens at Old Trafford.

On 17 October 2020, he played in the 2020 Challenge Cup Final defeat for Salford against Leeds at Wembley Stadium.

References

External links

Salford Red Devils profile
Widnes Vikings profile
SL profile

1993 births
Living people
Barrow Raiders players
Bradford Bulls players
English rugby league players
Hull Kingston Rovers players
Rugby league players from Wigan
Rugby league props
Salford Red Devils players
Widnes Vikings players
Wigan Warriors players
Workington Town players